The Japanese manga series Rosario + Vampire is written and illustrated by Akihisa Ikeda. The series revolves around Tsukune Aono, a mediocre high school student who accidentally enrolls into Yokai Academy, a special school for monsters and demons. Upon his arrival, he meets Moka Akashiya, who is a vampire who takes a strong liking to the taste of his blood. He soon befriends other students: Kurumu Kurono, a busty succubus; Ginei Morioka, a werewolf; Yukari Sendo, a young genius witch; Ruby Tojo, another witch; and Mizore Shirayuki, a snow fairy, all of whom openly express their affections toward Tsukune. Throughout his freshman year, Tsukune encounters various antagonists such as the Protection Committee and the Anti-Schoolers, and later starts to undergo changes which will solidify his role as the link between the human and monster worlds.

Rosario + Vampire began monthly serialization in the August 2004 issue of Monthly Shōnen Jump. The first tankōbon was released by Shueisha on October 4, 2004. Each volume features a handful of four-panel bonus comic strips and author's notes. In the Volume 7 author's notes, Ikeda mentions that he was working with a new editor. In volume 9, Ikeda mentions that the series is going to be adapted into an anime series. The tenth and final volume was released on October 4, 2007, spanning 39 chapters during its run. The reason for the ending of the series was because Monthly Shōnen Jump had ended its 37-year run. A bonus chapter of Rosario + Vampire was serialized in the September 2007 issue of Weekly Shōnen Jump. The series is continued with Rosario + Vampire: Season II, a sequel that began monthly serialization in the November 2007 issue of Jump Square.

The manga is licensed in North America and the United Kingdom by Viz Media under its Shonen Jump Advanced imprint, and in Australia and New Zealand by Madman Entertainment, with the volumes released between June 3, 2008, and November 3, 2009. Individual chapters of the series are called tests, while each volume on the English releases are called lessons.


Volume list

References

See also

Chapters
Rosario + Vampire